The 2019 Rugby Europe Sevens Conference was the third divisions of Rugby Europe's 2019 sevens season. It was held in Belgrade, Serbia on 8–9 June 2019, with the top two advancing to the 2020 Sevens Trophy. As winner of the tournament, Hungary advances to the European qualifying tournament for the 2020 Summer Olympics.

Pool stage

All times in Central European Summer Time (UTC+02:00)

Pool A

Pool B

Pool C

Pool D

Knockout stage

Cup

5-8th Place

9-12th Place

13-16th Place

Standings

External links
 Conference page

References

2019 rugby sevens competitions
2019 in Serbian sport
June 2019 sports events in Europe